The 2012 BWF Grand Prix Gold and Grand Prix was the sixth season of BWF Grand Prix Gold and Grand Prix.

Schedule
Below is the schedule released by Badminton World Federation:

Results

Winners

Performances by countries
Tabulated below are the Grand Prix performances based on countries. Only countries who have won a title are listed:

Grand Prix Gold

German Open

Swiss Open

Australian Open

Malaysia Open

Thailand Open

U.S. Open

Indonesia Open

Chinese Taipei Open

Bitburger Open

Macau Open

Korea Open

India Open

Grand Prix

Oceania Championships

Russian Open

Canada Open

Vietnam Open

Dutch Open

References

G
BWF Grand Prix Gold and Grand Prix